McGrawsville is an unincorporated community in Clay and Harrison townships, Miami County, in the U.S. state of Indiana.

History
McGrawsville was established as a depot on the Pan Handle Railroad. It was named for Nelson McGraw, who opened a small store on the site two years before the railroad was built. In 1887, McGrawsville contained one general store, a blacksmith shop, and a church. A post office was established at McGrawsville in 1867, and remained in operation until it was discontinued in 1942.

Geography
McGrawsville is located the intersection of Miami County roads S 300E and E 950S. It lies on the former Conrail railroad line (previously the Pennsylvania/Penn Central railroads).

Economy
Current and former businesses in McGrawsville include Overman-Waters Company (owned by Ralph Overman and Herrell Waters), Worl's Grocery, and the McGrawsville Feed & Grain Inc.

References

Unincorporated communities in Miami County, Indiana
Unincorporated communities in Indiana